St. Henry's Church may refer to:

St. Henry's Church (Bayonne, New Jersey)
St. Henry's Catholic Church (St. Henry, Ohio)
St. Henry's Catholic Church (Harriettsville, Ohio)
St. Henry's Catholic Church (Helsinki)